Shubuta Creek is a stream in the U.S. state of Mississippi. 

Shubuta is a name derived from the Choctaw language meaning "smoke, smoky, smoking". Variant names are "Bok Shubuta", "Cheehootee Creek", "Chobota", "Shoboti Creek", and "Shoebootee Creek".

References

Rivers of Mississippi
Rivers of Clarke County, Mississippi
Rivers of Jasper County, Mississippi
Mississippi placenames of Native American origin